Eleutherodactylus nitidus is a species of frog in the family Eleutherodactylidae. It is endemic to Mexico. Its natural habitat is subtropical or tropical dry forest. It is threatened by habitat loss.

References

nitidus
Amphibians described in 1869
Taxa named by Wilhelm Peters
Taxonomy articles created by Polbot